David Neo Chin Wee  is a Singaporean major-general who has been serving as Chief of Army since 2022. Prior to his appointment as Chief of Army, he was serving as Deputy Secretary (Technology) at the Ministry of Defence. Neo is also the first Commando to serve as Chief of Army.

Education
Neo attended Victoria School before graduating from the University of Illinois with a Bachelor of Engineering degree with honours in electrical engineering and a Bachelor of Arts degree with distinction in economics.

He subsequently went on to complete a Master of Business Administration degree in business administration, management and operations at the Massachusetts Institute of Technology, and a Master of Science degree in operations research at Stanford University under the Lee Kuan Kew Scholarship conferred by the Public Service Commission, and the Singapore Armed Forces Postgraduate Scholarship in 2012.

He also attended the Indonesian Army Command and Staff College (SESKOAD) in 2007 and attained the Top Foreign Student – Best Thesis.

Military career
Neo enlisted in the Singapore Armed Forces (SAF) in 1996 and served in the Singapore Army as a Commando officer.

Throughout his military career, he has held many appointments and roles, from command tours to staff appointments. The staff appointments include: Training Development Officer from April 2001 to December 2002; Staff Officer (Plans)/Joint Operations Department from November 2004 to August 2006; Chairman, SICUS Committee NDP 2008 from August 2007 to August 2008; Deputy Director (Planning)/Head of Strategic Plans from January 2010 to June 2012; Chairman, Show Committee NDP 2014; Head of Joint Plans and Transformation Department from October 2014 to July 2016; Director of Joint Operations from May 2019 to March 2021; and Deputy Secretary (Technology) on March 2021.

As Head of Joint Plans and Transformation Department and Director of Joint Operations, he had overseen the SAF's contributions to the national fight against COVID-19.

His command appointments include: Company Commander, 5th Company, 1st Commando Battalion from May 2003 to November 2004; Commanding Officer, 1st Battalion, Singapore Guards from January 2008 to December 2009; Commander, 2nd Singapore Infantry Brigade from August 2013 to October 2014; Commander, 3rd Division from July 2018 to June 2019. 

On 10 March 2022, he succeeded Goh Si Hou as the Chief of Army. On 1 July 2022, Neo was promoted to the rank of Major-General.

Non-military career 
Outside of the SAF, Neo holds several other appointments. Currently he is a board member of Temasek Defense Systems Institute since March 2021 and a director in DSTA since April 2021.

In the past, Neo was the programme director of the Pioneer Generation Office and the founding group chief of the Silver Generation Office under the Agency for Integrated Care. He was also a member of the board of governors of Singapore Polytechnic from April 2015 to April 2018 and alternate director in advanced material engineering from June 2013 to June 2016.

Awards and decorations 

 Public Administration Medal (Military) (Bronze) in 2014
  Long Service Medal (Military), in 2021
 Singapore Armed Forces Long Service and Good Conduct (20 Years) Medal
 Singapore Armed Forces Long Service and Good Conduct (10 Years) Medal with 15 year clasp
 Singapore Armed Forces Good Service Medal
 Master Parachutist Badge
 Advanced Freefall Badge
 Advanced Combat Skills Badge
 Basic Diver Badge
 US Ranger Tab
 US Airborne Badge
 US Army Infantry School DUI Badge
 Indonesian Army Freefall Badge
 Indonesian Army Jumpmaster Badge
 Australian Army Parachutist Badge 
Thai Army Airborne Badge

References

Living people
Singaporean military leaders
Place of birth missing (living people)
Victoria School, Singapore alumni
Chiefs of the Singapore Army
1977 births